Electric Rendezvous is the fifth studio album by jazz guitarist Al Di Meola that was released in 1982. It features flamenco guitarist Paco de Lucía (who recorded Friday Night in San Francisco with Di Meola and  John McLaughlin) on “Passion, Grace & Fire”.

Track listing
All songs by Al Di Meola unless otherwise noted.
"God Bird Change" (James Mingo Lewis) – 3:51 
"Electric Rendezvous" – 7:47 
"Passion, Grace & Fire" – 5:34 
"Cruisin'"  (Jan Hammer) – 4:16 
"Black Cat Shuffle  (Philippe Saisse) – 3:00 
"Ritmo de la Noche" – 4:17 
"Somalia" – 1:40 
"Jewel Inside a Dream" – 4:02

Personnel 
Al Di Meola – electric and acoustic guitars
Paco de Lucía – acoustic guitar on "Passion, Grace & Fire"
Anthony Jackson – bass guitar
Jan Hammer – keyboards
Philippe Saisse – keyboards on "Black Cat Shuffle"
Steve Gadd – drums and percussion
James Mingo Lewis – percussion

Chart performance

References

1982 albums
Al Di Meola albums
Columbia Records albums